EI or Ei may refer to:

Arts and media
 "E.I." (song), a single by Nelly
 E/I, a type of children's television programming shown in the United States
 Ei (album), an album by Maija Vilkkumaa
 "Ei" (song), its first single
 Eerie, Indiana, an American television series
 Enrique Iglesias, Spanish pop music singer-songwriter
 Exposure index, the film speed rating of photographic film as exposed

Businesses and organizations
 Aer Lingus (IATA code EI), the flag airline of Ireland
 The Earth Institute, a collection of research centers at Columbia University
 Education International, a global union federation of teachers' trade unions
 Elektronska Industrija Niš, electronics enterprise based in Niš, Serbia
 Energy Institute, the main professional organization for the energy industry within the UK
 Engineers Ireland, the professional body for engineers and engineering in Ireland
 Enterprise Ireland, is the Irish government organisation responsible for the development and growth of Irish enterprises in world markets.
 Expeditors International, the global logistics and freight forwarding company based out of Seattle, Washington
 The Electronic Intifada, an online publication covering the Israeli-Palestinian conflict from a Palestinian perspective

Linguistics
 ⟨ei⟩, a digraph found in some Latin alphabets
 The original name of the Greek letter Epsilon
 ɛɪ in the International Phonetic Alphabet (IPA)

Places
 Ei, Kagoshima, a town located in Ibusuki District, Kagoshima, Japan
 Emerald Isle, North Carolina, a town in Carteret County, North Carolina, United States

Science, technology, and mathematics
 Ei (prefix symbol), the prefix abbreviation of the binary unit prefix "exbi"
 Earth Interactions, a scientific journal published by the American Meteorological Society, American Geophysical Union, and Association of American Geographers
 Ei Compendex, an engineering bibliographic database
 Electron ionization, an ionization method in which energetic electrons interact with gas phase atoms or molecules to produce ions
 Electronic ignition, a variety of modern ignition system
 Engineering Index, an article index for engineering journals
 Engineer intern, an intermediary step to becoming a Professional Engineer
 Environmental illness (multiple chemical sensitivity), a chronic medical condition characterized by symptoms that the affected person attributes to exposure to low levels of chemicals
 Ionization energy (EI), the energy required to remove one electron from one atom to another
 Equine influenza, the disease caused by strains of Influenza A that are enzootic in horse species
 Exponential integral, a special function defined on the complex plane given the symbol Ei

Other uses
 Education Index, a United Nations measure of the level of educational development in a country
 Emotional intelligence, the ability to identify, assess, and control emotions
 Employment insurance, the unemployment benefits system of Canada
 Encyclopaedia of Islam, an encyclopaedia of the academic discipline of Islamic studies
 Enhanced interrogation, a euphemism for torture
 Ex infra, a Latin phrase meaning 'from below'
 Extreme ironing, an extreme sport and a performance art
 Esercito Italiano, Italian language for Italian Army